The 11th Green is a 2020 American drama film written and directed by Christopher Münch and starring Campbell Scott.

Cast
Campbell Scott
Agnes Bruckner
George Gerdes
Leith Burke
Tom Stokes
April Grace
Mozell Hill
Ian Hart
Currie Graham
David Clennon
Monte Markham
Kathryn Leigh Scott
Shari Elf
Clark Moorten

Release
The film premiered at the Palm Springs International Film Festival on January 10, 2020.  It was also released on June 26, 2020 at the Cinema Art Theater near Lewes, Delaware.

Reception
The film holds a 75% approval rating on review aggregator website Rotten Tomatoes, based on 8 reviews, with a weighted average of 6.5/10.  Richard Roeper of the Chicago Sun-Times awarded the film three stars out of four.

Sheri Linden of The Hollywood Reporter gave the film a positive review and called it "A thoughtful and compelling what-if, starring a never-better Campbell Scott."

References

External links
 
 

American drama films
Films scored by Mark Orton
2020 drama films
2020s English-language films
2020s American films